Acromantis grandis is a species of praying mantis found in Vietnam and Nepal.

See also
List of mantis genera and species

References

Grand
Mantodea of Asia
Mantodea of Southeast Asia
Insects of Nepal
Insects of Vietnam
Insects described in 1915